Naituku is a Fijian surname. Notable people with this surname include:

 Epineri Naituku (1963–2019), Fijian rugby union player
 Sairusi Naituku (1961–2016), Fijian rugby union player

Fijian-language surnames